Sandra Gin is a broadcast journalist who served as news anchor/reporter for KHOU-TV in Houston, Texas from 1994 to 2002.

Sandra was a news anchor and reporter with KHOU-TV in Houston from 1994 to 2002.

Awards
1997, won Suncoast Regional Emmy Award for best News Oriented Special on International Issues, Hong Kong: Under the Dragon, an examination of the handover of Hong Kong to Communist China
2009, won Daytime Emmy Award as producer of the series Christina's Court

References

External links
KHOU-TV Web site
Official website
Hollywood for Kids Website

American television journalists
American women television journalists
Television anchors from Houston
Living people
Regional Emmy Award winners
Year of birth missing (living people)
21st-century American women